Anantha Venkatarami Reddy (born 1 August 1956) has been a member of the 11th, 12th, 14th and 15th Lok Sabha of India. He represents the Anantapur constituency of Andhra Pradesh and is a member of the Indian National Congress up to 2014 March, when he joined YSRCP. He contested as a member of the Legislative Assembly from the Anantapur Urban constituency in 2019 and won.

References

Indian National Congress politicians from Andhra Pradesh
1958 births
Living people
India MPs 1996–1997
India MPs 1998–1999
India MPs 2004–2009
Telugu politicians
India MPs 2009–2014
Lok Sabha members from Andhra Pradesh
People from Anantapur district
Andhra Pradesh MLAs 2019–2024